Osilinus is a genus of sea snails, marine gastropod mollusks in the family Trochidae, the top snails.

This genus has become a synonym of Phorcus Risso, 1826

Species
Species within the genus Osilinus include:
 Osilinus articulatus (Lamarck, 1822): synonym of Phorcus articulatus (Lamarck, 1822)
 Osilinus atratus (Wood, 1828): synonym of Phorcus atratus (Wood, 1828)
 Osilinus kotschyi (Philippi, 1849): synonym of Priotrochus kotschyi (Philippi, 1849)
 Osilinus lineatus (da Costa, 1778): synonym of Phorcus lineatus (da Costa, 1778)
 Osilinus mutabilis (Philippi, 1846): synonym of Phorcus mutabilis (Philippi, 1846)
 Osilinus punctulatus (Lamarck, 1822): synonym of Phorcus punctulatus (Lamarck, 1822)
 Osilinus sauciatus (Koch, 1845): synonym of Phorcus sauciatus (Koch, 1845)
 Osilinus turbinatus (Von Born, 1778): synonym of Phorcus turbinatus (Born, 1778)

References

 Vaught, K.C. (1989). A classification of the living Mollusca. American Malacologists: Melbourne, FL (USA). . XII, 195 pp
 Gofas, S.; Le Renard, J.; Bouchet, P. (2001). Mollusca, in: Costello, M.J. et al. (Ed.) (2001). European register of marine species: a check-list of the marine species in Europe and a bibliography of guides to their identification. Collection Patrimoines Naturels, 50: pp. 180–213
 Donald K.M., Kennedy M. & Spencer H.G. (2005) The phylogeny and taxonomy of austral monodontine topshells (Mollusca: Gastropoda: Trochidae), inferred from DNA sequences. Molecular Phylogenetics and Evolution 37: 474-483
 Williams S.T., Donald K.M., Spencer H.G. & Nakano T. (2010) Molecular systematics of the marine gastropod families Trochidae and Calliostomatidae (Mollusca: Superfamily Trochoidea). Molecular Phylogenetics and Evolution 54:783-809

Trochidae
Taxa named by Rodolfo Amando Philippi
Gastropod genera